Half Past Midnight is a 1948 American comedy murder mystery film. It was William F. Claxton's first directed feature after eight years as a film editor.

Plot
Kent Taylor plays a man who meets a dancer in a nightclub.  She's implicated in a killing, and he's drawn into escaping from the police with her through Chinatown as they seek the real murderer.

Cast

 Kent Taylor as Wade Hamilton
 Peggy Knudsen as Sally Ferris / Sally Parker
 Joe Sawyer as Detective Nash
 Walter Sande as Detective MacDonald
 Martin Kosleck as Cortez
 Mabel Paige as Hester Thornwall
 Gil Stratton as Chick Patrick 
 Jean Wong as Blossom Gow
 Jane Everett as Carlotta Evans
 Damian O'Flynn as Murray Evans
 Richard Loo as Lee Gow
 Tom Dugan as Bus Tour Guide 
 Jean De Briac as Nightclub Headwaiter
 Willie Best as Nightclub Janitor
 Victor Sen Yung as Hotel Porter

External links
 

1948 films
20th Century Fox films
1948 mystery films
American mystery films
Films produced by Sol M. Wurtzel
American black-and-white films
Films directed by William F. Claxton
1940s American films